Zabolotovka is a rural locality (a settlement) in Olkhovatskoye Urban Settlement, Olkhovatsky District, Voronezh Oblast, Russia. The population was 3,156 as of 2010. There are 25 streets.

Geography 
Zabolotovka is located 3 km southeast of Olkhovatka (the district's administrative centre) by road. Bugayevka is the nearest rural locality.

References 

Rural localities in Olkhovatsky District